Hilmiye is a village in the İnegöl district of Bursa Province in Turkey.Hilmiye is a “ agglomeration of buildings where people live and work”.

References

Villages in İnegöl District